Makhzen is the governing institution in Morocco and in pre-1957 Tunisia, centered on the monarch and consisting of royal notables, top-ranking military personnel, landowners, security service bosses, civil servants and other well-connected members of the establishment. The term "Makhzen" is also popularly used in Morocco as a word meaning "State" or "Government".

Etymology

The word makhzen literally means "warehouse" in Arabic (from khazana 'to store up'), where the king's civil servants used to receive their wages; but this usage of the word became in Moroccan Arabic synonymous with the elite. It is likely a metonymy related to taxes, which the makhzen used to collect; the term may also refer to the state or its actors, but this usage is increasingly rare and is primarily used by the older generation.

It is the origin of the Spanish and Portuguese  almacén and armazém (with addition of the Arabic definite article), meaning warehouse. It was also incorporated into French and Italian as magasin (meaning 'store') and magazzino. It came into the English language from Middle French as magazine, originally referring to a storehouse for ammunition and later to publications.  With the "store" meaning, it was also adopted from French into Russian as Магазин and into Romanian as magazin.

In the Berber culture of Morocco, the Berber equivalent of mekhzen ('warehouse') would be agadir. Berber tribes also considered the agadir (warehouse of the tribe's crops and valuables) as a powerhouse guarded and managed through a legal system.

Makhzen in Morocco
The Makhzen is a very ancient notion in Morocco, it roughly coincides with the notion of the feudal state predating the French protectorate in Morocco. Bilād al-makhzen ('the land of the makhzen') was the term for the areas under central government authority, while those areas still run by tribal authority were known as bilād as-siba ('the land of dissidence'). Hubert Lyautey, who served as resident-general of Morocco from 1912 until 1925 during the era of the protectorate, was a fervent proponent of indirect colonisation, especially in Berber-speaking areas. Lyautey maintained the role of the Makhzen and even enhanced it by giving important roles to local notables such as Thami El Glaoui. Local notables acted as a relay between the population and the French authorities.

Makhzen in Tunisia

See also
 Auxiliary Forces (Mokhzani)
 Network monarchy
 List of Moroccan royal residences, often referred to as Dar al-Makhzen

References 

Deep politics
Politics of Morocco
Moroccan Arabic words and phrases
Human rights in Morocco
Oligarchy